Saki East is a Local Government Area in Oyo State, Nigeria. Its headquarters are in the town of Ago-Amodu.

It has an area of 1,569 km and a population of 110,223 at the 2006 census.

The postal code of the area is 203.

Saki East Local Government Area has five major communities which are Ago-Amodu, Sepeteri, Ogbooro, Oje-Owode and Agbonle. Of these the LGA capital is at Ago-Amodu.

Health Services
Saki East has 15 primary health centers, 2 health posts, 9 secondary health centers (3 government; 6 private) and an annex of the University College Hospital, Ibadan located at Sepeteri, which provides tertiary level care including eye surgery and optical services.

References

Local Government Areas in Oyo State